Heraclia poggei is a species of moth of the family Noctuidae. It is found in western Africa, Guinea and Cameroon.

References 

Agaristinae
Moths of Africa
Moths described in 1879